Kiprop is a name used by the Kalenjin people. People with this name include:
 Asbel Kiprop (born 1989), Kenyan middle distance runner
 Boniface Kiprop Toroitich (born 1985), Ugandan long-distance runner
 Fred Kiprop (born 1975), Kenyan long-distance runner
 Wilson Kiprop (born 1987), Kenyan long-distance runner
 Kiprop Bundotich, Owner of Buzeki group

References

Surnames
Kalenjin names